Kaide Ellis (born 4 August 1996) is an Australian professional rugby league footballer who plays as a  and  for the Wigan Warriors in the ESL.

He previously played for the Penrith Panthers in the National Rugby League.

Early career
Ellis was born in Dubbo, New South Wales, Australia, and was educated at Dubbo College Senior Campus where he represented 2013 NSW CHS team.

Kaide played his junior rugby league at St Johns Dubbo and South Dubbo Raiders. 

He signed with the Penrith Panthers and won 2015 National Youth Competition Grand Final.

Playing career

2017
He played in the Panthers State Championship final vs the PNG Hunters, where he also got man of the match.

2018
Ellis made his first grade debut in Round 6 of the 2018 NRL season against the Gold Coast Titans at Penrith Park which ended in a 35-12 victory.  Ellis was sin binned during the match for repeated infringements during the second half.

2020 
On 12 July, Ellis was released by the Penrith club, signing for St. George Illawarra until the end of the 2020 season.

In November 2020, he signed a one-year contract extension to remain at the club in 2021.

2021
On 15 July 2021, it was reported that he had signed for Wigan in the Super League on a three-year deal for the 2022 season.

2022
In round 5 of the 2022 Super League season, Ellis was placed on report for fighting during the Wigan's 28-0 loss to Catalans Dragons.  Ellis was subsequently banned for five matches over the incident.
On 28 May 2022, he played for Wigan in their 2022 Challenge Cup Final victory over Huddersfield.

Controversy
On 5 July 2021, Ellis was fined $5000 by the NRL and suspended for one game after breaching the game's Covid-19 biosecurity protocols when he  attended a party along with 12 other St. George Illawarra players at Paul Vaughan's property.

References

External links
St. George Illawarra Dragons profile
Penrith Panthers profile

1996 births
Living people
Australian rugby league players
Australian expatriate sportspeople in England
Penrith Panthers players
Rugby league locks
Rugby league players from Dubbo
St. George Illawarra Dragons players
Wigan Warriors players